The Alagoas heart-tongued frog (Phyllodytes acuminatus)  is a species of frog in the family Hylidae, the tree frogs and allies. It is endemic to Brazil, where it is known from coastal regions in Bahia, Alagoas, and Pernambuco.

This frog is associated with bromeliads. It is a common and widespread species but its populations are decreasing due to habitat loss.

This species can be differentiated from other members of genus Phyllodytes by the double row of papillae surrounding its mouth.

References

Phyllodytes
Endemic fauna of Brazil
Amphibians described in 1966
Taxonomy articles created by Polbot